António Henrique Monteiro da Costa (born 20 August 1928 in São Paio de Oleiros) is a former Portuguese footballer who played as a forward.

External links 
 
 

1928 births
Living people
Portuguese footballers
Association football forwards
Primeira Liga players
FC Porto players
Portugal international footballers